Hôtel de Nevers may refer to:

 Hôtel de Nevers (left bank), Quai de Nevers, 6th arrondissement, Paris, Ile-de-France, France
 Hôtel de Nevers (rue de Richelieu), right bank, 2nd arrondissement, Paris, Ile-de-France, France

See also

 Palais ducal de Nevers, Nevers, Nièvre, Bourgogne-Franche-Comté, France
 
 Nevers (disambiguation)
 Hotel (disambiguation)